Mat Bridge  (or Zogu Bridge) is a bridge across the Mat river near the town of Milot in the northwestern part of Albania. It served to improve communications between south-central Albania and the northern part of the country, particularly to the northern town of Shkodër.

It was named after the first King of Albania, King Zog, who ruled from 1928 until the country was invaded by Benito Mussolini in 1939.

It remained the first and only permanent bridge over the Mat for 50 years, when a second bridge was built. A third was built 25 years after that.

See also
 
 
 List of bridges in Albania

References

Bridges in Albania
Buildings and structures in Kurbin